The Iliad ("a poem about Ilium") is one of two major ancient Greek epic poems attributed to Homer. It is one of the oldest extant works of literature still widely read by modern audiences. As with the Odyssey, the poem is divided into 24 books and was written in dactylic hexameter. It contains 15,693 lines in its most widely accepted version. Set towards the end of the Trojan War, a ten-year siege of the city of  Troy by a coalition of Mycenaean Greek states, the poem depicts significant events in the siege's final weeks. In particular, it depicts a fierce quarrel between King Agamemnon and a celebrated warrior, Achilles. It is a central part of the Epic Cycle. The Iliad is often regarded as the first substantial piece of European literature.

The Iliad, and the Odyssey, were likely written down in Homeric Greek, a literary amalgam of Ionic Greek and other dialects, probably around the late 8th or early 7th century BC. Homer's authorship was infrequently questioned in antiquity, but contemporary scholarship predominantly assumes that the Iliad and the Odyssey were composed independently and that the stories formed as part of a long oral tradition. Given widespread illiteracy, audiences were more likely to have heard the poem than read it; it was performed by professional reciters of Homer known as rhapsodes. 

Critical themes in the poem include kleos (glory), pride, fate and wrath. The poem is frequently described as a masculine or heroic epic, especially compared with the Odyssey. It contains detailed descriptions of ancient war instruments and battle tactics, and fewer female characters. The Olympian gods also play a major role in the poem, aiding their favoured warriors on the battlefield and intervening in personal disputes. Their characterisation in the poem humanised them for Ancient Greek audiences, giving a concrete sense of their cultural and religious tradition. In terms of formal style, the poem's repetitions, use of similes and epithets, are often explored by scholars.

Synopsis

Exposition (Books 1–4)
() The story begins with an invocation to the Muse. The events begin in medias res towards the end of the Trojan War, fought between the Trojans and the besieging Achaeans. The Achaean forces consist of armies from many different Greek kingdoms, led by their respective kings or princes. Agamemnon, king of Mycenae, acts as commander for these united armies.

Chryses, a Trojan priest of Apollo, offers the Achaeans wealth for the return of his daughter Chryseis, held captive by Agamemnon. Although most of the Achaean kings are in favor of the offer, Agamemnon refuses.  prays for Apollo's help, and Apollo sends a plague to afflict the Achaean army. After nine days of plague, Achilles, the leader of the Myrmidon forces and aristos achaion ("best of the Greeks"), calls an assembly to deal with the problem. Under pressure, Agamemnon agrees to return Chryseis to her father, but decides to take Achilles' captive, Briseis, as compensation. Because war prizes were correlated with honor, Agamemnon's decision dishonors Achilles in front of the assembled Achaean forces. Achilles furiously declares that he and his men will no longer fight for Agamemnon. Odysseus returns Chryseis to her father, causing Apollo to end the plague.

In the meantime, Agamemnon's messengers take Briseis away. Achilles becomes very upset and prays to his mother, Thetis, a minor goddess and sea nymph. Achilles asks his mother to ask Zeus to allow the Achaeans to be beaten back by the Trojans, until their ships are at risk of burning. Only then will Agamemnon realize how much the Achaeans need Achilles, and restore his honor. Thetis does so, and Zeus agrees.() Zeus then sends a dream to Agamemnon, urging him to attack Troy. Agamemnon heeds the dream, but first decides to test the Achaean army's morale by telling them to go home. But nine years into the war, the soldiers' morale has worn thin. The plan backfires, and only the intervention of Odysseus, inspired by Athena, stops a rout. Odysseus confronts and beats Thersites, a common soldier who voices discontent about fighting Agamemnon's war.

The Achaeans deploy in companies upon the Trojan plain. When news of the Achaean deployment reaches King Priam, the Trojans respond in a sortie upon the plain. The armies approach each other, but before they meet, Paris offers to end the war by fighting a duel with Menelaus, urged by Hector, his brother and hero of Troy. Here, the initial cause of the entire war is explained: Helen, wife of Menelaus, and the most beautiful woman in the world. Paris, either through seduction or by force, stole Helen away from Menelaus' home in Sparta. Menelaus and Paris agree to duel; Helen will marry the victor. However, when Paris is beaten, Aphrodite rescues him and leads him to bed with Helen before Menelaus can kill him.

() The gods deliberate over whether the war should end here, but Hera convinces Zeus to wait for the utter destruction of Troy. Athena prompts the Trojan archer Pandaros to shoot Menelaus. Menelaus is wounded, and the truce is broken. Fighting breaks out, and many minor Trojans are killed.

Duels of Greek and Trojan Heroes (Books 5–7)
() In the fighting, Diomedes kills many Trojans, including Pandaros, and defeats Aeneas. Aphrodite rescues him before he can be killed, but Diomedes attacks her and wounds the goddess's wrist. Apollo faces Diomedes and warns him against warring with gods, which Diomedes ignores. Apollo sends Ares to defeat Diomedes. Many heroes and commanders join in, including Hector, and the gods supporting each side try to influence the battle. Emboldened by Athena, Diomedes wounds Ares and puts him out of action.

() Hector rallies the Trojans and prevents a rout. Diomedes and the Trojan Glaukos find common ground after a duel and exchange unequal gifts, while Glaukos tells Diomedes the story of Bellerophon. Hector enters the city, urges prayers and sacrifices, incites Paris to battle, and bids his wife Andromache and son Astyanax farewell on the city walls. He then rejoins the battle. Hector duels with Ajax, but nightfall interrupts the fight, and both sides retire. The Trojans quarrel about returning Helen. Paris offers to return the treasure he took and give further wealth as compensation, but not Helen, and the offer is refused. Both sides agree to a day's truce to burn the dead. The Achaeans also build a wall and trench to protect their camp and ships.

The Rout of the Greeks (Books 8–15)
() The next morning, Zeus prohibits the gods from interfering, and fighting begins anew. The Trojans prevail and force the Achaeans back to their wall. Hera and Athena are forbidden to help. Night falls before the Trojans can assail the Achaean wall. They camp in the field to attack at first light, and their watchfires light the plain like stars.

() Meanwhile, the Achaeans are desperate. Agamemnon admits his error, and sends an embassy composed of Odysseus, Ajax, Phoenix, and two heralds to offer Briseis and extensive gifts to Achilles, if only he will return to the fighting. Achilles and his companion Patroclus receive the embassy well. However, considering the slight to his honor too great, Achilles angrily refuses Agamemnon's offer and declares that he would only return to battle if the Trojans reached his ships and threatened them with fire. The embassy returns empty-handed.

() Later that night, Odysseus and Diomedes venture out to the Trojan lines, kill the Trojan Dolon, and wreak havoc in the camps of some Thracian allies of Troy's.() In the morning, the fighting is fierce, and Agamemnon, Diomedes, and Odysseus are all wounded. Achilles sends Patroclus from his camp to inquire about the Achaean casualties, and while there, Patroclus is moved to pity by a speech of Nestor's. Nestor asks Patroclus to beg Achilles to rejoin the fighting, or if he will not, to lead the army wearing Achilles' armor.

() The Trojans attack the Achaean wall on foot. Hector leads the terrible fighting, despite an omen that their charge will fail. The Achaeans are overwhelmed and routed, the wall's gate is broken, and Hector charges in. The Achaeans fall back to their ships.

() Poseidon pities the Achaeans, and decides to disobey Zeus and help them. He rallies the Achaean's spirits, and they begin to push the Trojans back. Poseidon's nephew Amphimachus is killed in the battle; Poseidon imbues Idomeneus with godly power. Many fall on both sides. The Trojan seer Polydamas urges Hector to fall back because of a bad omen, but is ignored.

() Hera seduces Zeus and lulls him to sleep, allowing Poseidon to help the Greeks. The Trojans are driven back onto the plain. Ajax wounds Hector, who is then carried back to Troy. Zeus awakes and is enraged by Poseidon's intervention. However, he reassures Hera that Troy is still fated to fall once Hector kills Patroclus. Poseidon is recalled from the battlefield, and Zeus sends Apollo to aid the Trojans. The Trojans once again breach the wall, and the battle reaches the ships.

The Death of Patroclus (Books 16–18)
() Patroclus cannot stand to watch any longer, and goes to Achilles, weeping. He briefly admonishes him for his stubbornness, then asks Achilles to allow him to fight in his place, wearing his armor so that he will be mistaken for Achilles. Achilles relents and lends Patroclus his armor, but sends him off with a stern admonition to come back to him, and not to pursue the Trojans. Achilles says that after all has been made right, he and Patroclus will take Troy together.

Patroclus leads the Myrmidons into battle and arrives as the Trojans set fire to the first ships. The Trojans are routed by the sudden onslaught, and Patroclus begins his assault by killing Zeus's son Sarpedon, a leading ally of the Trojans. Patroclus, ignoring Achilles' command, pursues and reaches the gates of Troy, where Apollo himself stops him. Patroclus kills Hector's brother Cebriones, is set upon by Apollo and Euphorbos, and is finally killed by Hector.

() Hector takes Achilles' armor from the fallen Patroclus. The Achaeans fight to retrieve Patroclus' body from the Trojans, who attempt to carry it back to Troy at Hector's command.  Antilochus is sent to tell Achilles the news, and ask him to help retrieve the body.

() When Achilles hears of Patroclus' death, he screams so loudly in his grief that his mother, Thetis, hears him from the bottom of the ocean. Thetis grieves, too, knowing that Achilles is fated to die young if he kills Hector. Though he knows it will seal his own fate, Achilles vows to kill Hector in order to avenge Patroclus.

Achilles is urged to help retrieve Patroclus' body, but has no armor to wear. Bathed in a brilliant radiance by Athena, Achilles stands next to the Achaean wall and roars in rage. The Trojans are terrified by his appearance, and the Achaeans manage to bear Patroclus' body away. Polydamas urges Hector again to withdraw into the city; again Hector refuses, and the Trojans camp on the plain at nightfall.

Achilles mourns Patroclus, brokenhearted. Meanwhile, at Thetis' request, Hephaestus fashions a new set of armor for Achilles, including a magnificently wrought shield.

The Rage of Achilles (Books 19–24)
() In the morning, Thetis brings Achilles his new set of armor, only to find him weeping over Patroclus' body. Achilles arms for battle and rallies the Achaean warriors. Agamemnon gives Achilles all the promised gifts, including Briseis, but Achilles is indifferent to them. The Achaeans take their meal; Achilles refuses to eat. His horse, Xanthos, prophesies Achilles' death; Achilles is indifferent. Achilles goes into battle, Automedon drives his chariot.

() Zeus lifts the ban on the gods' interference, and the gods freely help both sides. Achilles, burning with rage and grief, slays many. Achilles cuts off half the Trojans' number in the river and slaughters them, clogging the river with bodies. The river god, Scamander, confronts Achilles and commands him to stop killing Trojans, but Achilles refuses. They fight, until Scamander is beaten back by Hephaestus' firestorm. The gods fight amongst themselves. The great gates of the city are opened to receive the fleeing Trojans, and Apollo leads Achilles away from the city by pretending to be a Trojan. When Apollo reveals himself to Achilles, the Trojans have retreated into the city, all except for Hector.

Despite the counsel of Polydamas and the pleas of his parents, Priam and Hecuba, Hector resolves to face Achilles. When Achilles approaches, however, Hector's will fails him. He flees, and is chased by Achilles around the city. Finally, Athena tricks him into stopping, and he turns to face his opponent. After a brief duel, Achilles stabs Hector through the neck. Before dying, Hector reminds Achilles that he, too, is fated to die. Achilles strips Hector of his own armor, gloating over his death. Achilles then dishonors Hector's body by lashing it to the back of his chariot and dragging it around the city. The Trojans grieve.

() The ghost of Patroclus comes to Achilles in a dream, urging him to carry out the burial rites so that Patroclus' spirit can move on to the underworld. Patroclus asks Achilles to arrange for their bones to be entombed together in a single urn; Achilles agrees. Patroclus' body is burned. The Achaeans hold a day of funeral games, and Achilles gives out the prizes.

() Achilles is lost in his grief, and spends his days mourning Patroclus and dragging Hector's body behind his chariot. Dismayed by Achilles' continued abuse of Hector's body, Zeus decides that it must be returned to Priam. Led by Hermes, Priam takes a wagon filled with gifts out of Troy, across the plains, and into the Achaean camp unnoticed. He clasps Achilles by the knees and begs for his son's body. Achilles is moved to tears, and finally relents in his anger. The two lament their losses in the war. Achilles agrees to give Hector's body back, and to give the Trojans twelve days to properly mourn and bury Hector. Achilles apologizes to Patroclus, fearing he has dishonored him by returning Hector's body. After a meal, Priam carries Hector's body back into Troy. Hector is buried, and the city mourns.

Greek gods and the Iliad

The gods of Greek religion
The religion had no founder, and was not the creation of an inspired teacher, which were popular origins of existing religions in the world. The individuals were free to believe what they wanted, as the Greek religion was created out of a consensus of the people. These beliefs coincide to the thoughts about the gods in polytheistic Greek religion. Adkins and Pollard (2020/1998), agree with this by saying, "the early Greeks personalized every aspect of their world, natural and cultural, and their experiences in it. The earth, the sea, the mountains, the rivers, custom-law (themis), and one's share in society and its goods were all seen in personal as well as naturalistic terms."

As a result of this thinking, each god or goddess in Polytheistic Greek religion is attributed to an aspect of the human world. For example, Poseidon is the god of the sea, Aphrodite is the goddess of beauty, Ares is the god of war, and so on and so forth for many other gods. This is how Greek culture was defined as many Athenians felt the presence of their gods through divine intervention in significant events in their lives. Oftentimes they found these events to be mysterious and inexplicable.

Within the Iliad
In the literary Trojan War of the Iliad, the Olympian gods, goddesses, and minor deities fight among themselves and participate in human warfare, often by interfering with humans to counter other gods. Unlike their portrayals in Greek religion, Homer's portrayal of gods suited his narrative purpose. The gods in traditional thought of 4th-century Athenians were not spoken of in terms familiar to the works of Homer. The Classical-era historian Herodotus says that Homer and Hesiod, his contemporary, were the first writers to name and describe the gods' appearance and character.

Mary Lefkowitz (2003) discusses the relevance of divine action in the Iliad, attempting to answer the question of whether or not divine intervention is a discrete occurrence (for its own sake), or if such godly behaviors are mere human character metaphors. The intellectual interest of Classic-era authors, such as Thucydides and Plato, was limited to their utility as "a way of talking about human life rather than a description or a truth", because, if the gods remain religious figures, rather than human metaphors, their "existence"—without the foundation of either dogma or a bible of faiths—then allowed Greek culture the intellectual breadth and freedom to conjure gods fitting any religious function they required as a people.

Psychologist Julian Jaynes (1976) uses the Iliad as a major piece of evidence for his theory of the Bicameral Mind, which posits that until about the time described in the Iliad, humans had a far different mentality from present-day humans. He says that humans during that time were lacking what is today called consciousness. He suggests that humans heard and obeyed commands from what they identified as gods, until the change in human mentality that incorporated the motivating force into the conscious self. He points out that almost every action in the Iliad is directed, caused, or influenced by a god, and that earlier translations show an astonishing lack of words suggesting thought, planning, or introspection. Those that do appear, he argues, are misinterpretations made by translators imposing a modern mentality on the characters.

Divine intervention 

Some scholars believe that the gods may have intervened in the mortal world because of quarrels they may have had among each other. Homer interprets the world at this time by using the passion and emotion of the gods to be determining factors of what happens on the human level. An example of one of these relationships in the Iliad occurs between Athena, Hera, and Aphrodite. In the final book of the poem Homer writes, "He offended Athena and Hera—both goddesses." Athena and Hera are envious of Aphrodite because of a beauty pageant on Mount Olympus in which Paris chose Aphrodite to be the most beautiful goddess over both Hera and Athena. Wolfgang Kullmann further goes on to say, "Hera's and Athena's disappointment over the victory of Aphrodite in the Judgement of Paris determines the whole conduct of both goddesses in The Iliad and is the cause of their hatred for Paris, the Judge, and his town Troy."

Hera and Athena then continue to support the Achaean forces throughout the poem because Paris is part of the Trojans, while Aphrodite aids Paris and the Trojans. The emotions between the goddesses often translate to actions they take in the mortal world. For example, in Book 3 of the Iliad, Paris challenges any of the Achaeans to a single combat and Menelaus steps forward. Menelaus was dominating the battle and was on the verge of killing Paris. "Now he'd have hauled him off and won undying glory but Aphrodite, Zeus's daughter, was quick to the mark, snapped the rawhide strap." Aphrodite intervened out of her own self-interest to save Paris from the wrath of Menelaus because Paris had helped her to win the beauty pageant. The partisanship of Aphrodite towards Paris induces constant intervention by all of the gods, especially to give motivational speeches to their respective proteges, while often appearing in the shape of a human being they are familiar with. This connection of emotions to actions is just one example out of many that occur throughout the poem.

Themes

Fate
Fate propels most of the events of the Iliad. Once set, gods and men abide it, neither truly able nor willing to contest it. How fate is set is unknown, but it is told by the Fates and by Zeus through sending omens to seers such as Calchas. Men and their gods continually speak of heroic acceptance and cowardly avoidance of one's slated fate. Fate does not determine every action, incident, and occurrence, but it does determine the outcome of life—before killing him, Hector calls Patroclus a fool  Patroclus retorts:

Here, Patroclus alludes to fated death by Hector's hand, and Hector's fated death by Achilles's hand. Each accepts the outcome of his life, yet, no one knows if the gods can alter fate. The first instance of this doubt occurs in Book XVI. Seeing Patroclus about to kill Sarpedon, his mortal son, Zeus says:

About his dilemma, Hera asks Zeus:

In deciding between losing a son or abiding fate, Zeus, King of the Gods, allows it. This motif recurs when he considers sparing Hector, whom he loves and respects. This time, it is Athena who challenges him:

Again, Zeus appears capable of altering fate, but does not, deciding instead to abide set outcomes; similarly, fate spares Aeneas, after Apollo convinces the over-matched Trojan to fight Achilles. Poseidon cautiously speaks:

Divinely aided, Aeneas escapes the wrath of Achilles and survives the Trojan War. Whether or not the gods can alter fate, they do abide it, despite its countering their human allegiances; thus, the mysterious origin of fate is a power beyond the gods. Fate implies the primeval, tripartite division of the world that Zeus, Poseidon, and Hades effected in deposing their father, Cronus, for its dominion. Zeus took the Air and the Sky, Poseidon the Waters, and Hades the Underworld, the land of the dead—yet they share dominion of the Earth. Despite the earthly powers of the Olympic gods, only the Three Fates set the destiny of Man.

("glory, fame") is the concept of glory earned in heroic battle. In Book IX (IX.410–16), he poignantly tells Agamemnon's envoys—Odysseus, Phoenix, Ajax—begging his reinstatement to battle about having to choose between two fates (9.411).

The passage reads:

In the poem,  ("imperishable") occurs five other times, each occurrence denotes an object: Agamemnon's sceptre, the wheel of Hebe's chariot, the house of Poseidon, the throne of Zeus, the house of Hephaestus. Translator Lattimore renders  as 'forever immortal' and as 'forever imperishable'—connoting Achilles's mortality by underscoring his greater reward in returning to battle Troy.

 is often given visible representation by the prizes won in battle. When Agamemnon takes Briseis from Achilles, he takes away a portion of the  he had earned.

Achilles' shield, crafted by Hephaestus and given to him by his mother Thetis, bears an image of stars in the centre. The stars conjure profound images of the place of a single man, no matter how heroic, in the perspective of the entire cosmos.

("homecoming") occurs seven times in the poem, making it a minor theme in the Iliad itself. Yet the concept of homecoming is much explored in other Ancient Greek literature, especially in the post-war homeward fortunes experienced by the Atreidae (Agamemnon and Menelaus), and Odysseus (see the Odyssey).

Pride
Pride drives the plot of the Iliad. The Achaeans gather on the plain of Troy to wrest Helen from the Trojans. Though the majority of the Trojans would gladly return Helen to the Achaeans, they defer to the pride of their prince, Alexandros, also known as Paris. Within this frame, Homer's work begins. At the start of the Iliad, Agamemnon's pride sets forth a chain of events that leads him to take from Achilles, Briseis, the girl that he had originally given Achilles in return for his martial prowess. Due to this slight, Achilles refuses to fight and asks his mother, Thetis, to make sure that Zeus causes the Achaeans to suffer on the battlefield until Agamemnon comes to realize the harm he has done to Achilles.

Achilles' pride allows him to beg Thetis for the deaths of his Achaean friends. When in Book 9 his friends urge him to return, offering him loot and his girl, Briseis, he refuses, stuck in his vengeful pride. Achilles remains stuck until the very end, when his anger at himself for Patroclus' death overcomes his pride at Agamemnon's slight and he returns to kill Hector. He overcomes his pride again when he keeps his anger in check and returns Hector to Priam at epic's close. From epic start to epic finish, pride drives the plot.

Heroism 
The Iliad portrays the theme of heroism in a variety of different ways through different characters, mainly Achilles, Hector, Patroclus, etc. Though the traditional concept of heroism is often tied directly to the protagonist, who is meant to be written in a heroic light, the Iliad plays with this idea of heroism and does not make it explicitly clear who the true hero of the story is. The story of the Iliad follows the great Greek warrior Achilles, as well as his rage and the destruction it causes. Parallel to this, the story also follows the Trojan warrior Hector and his efforts to fight to protect his family and his people. It is generally assumed that, because he is the protagonist, Achilles is the hero of this story. Examining his actions throughout the Iliad and comparing them to those of other characters, however, some may come to the conclusion that Achilles is not really the hero, and perhaps even an antihero. It can also be argued that Hector is the true hero of the Iliad due to his inherently heroic qualities, such as a loyalty to his family as well as his strength and determination to defend his people, as well as the focus at the end of the story on burying Hector with honor. The true hero of the Iliad is never shown explicitly and is purposefully left up to interpretation by the author Homer, who aimed to show the complexity and flaws of both characters, regardless of who is considered the “true” hero.

In Book I, the Achaean troubles begin with King Agamemnon's dishonorable, unkingly behavior—first, by threatening the priest Chryses (1.11), then, by aggravating them in disrespecting Achilles, by confiscating Briseis from him (1.171). The warrior's consequent rancor against the dishonorable king ruins the Achaean military cause.

(hubris)
The epic takes as its thesis the anger of Achilles and the destruction it brings. Anger disturbs the distance between human beings and the gods. Uncontrolled anger destroys orderly social relationships and upsets the balance of correct actions necessary to keep the gods away from human beings. Despite the epic's focus on Achilles' rage,  also plays a prominent role, serving as both kindling and fuel for many destructive events.

Hubris forces Paris to fight against Menelaus. Agamemnon spurs the Achaean to fight, by calling into question Odysseus, Diomedes, and Nestor's pride, asking why they were cowering and waiting for help when they should be the ones leading the charge. While the events of the Iliad focus on the Achilles' rage and the destruction it brings on,  fuels and stokes them both.

The poem's initial word,  (acc. His personal rage and wounded soldier's pride propel the story: the Achaeans' faltering in battle, the slayings of Patroclus and Hector, and the fall of Troy. In Book I, the Wrath of Achilles first emerges in the Achilles-convoked meeting, between the Greek kings and the seer Calchas. King Agamemnon dishonours Chryses, the Trojan priest of Apollo, by refusing with a threat the restitution of his daughter, Chryseis—despite the proffered ransom of "gifts beyond count." The insulted priest prays to Apollo for help, and a nine-day rain of divine plague arrows falls upon the Achaeans. Moreover, in that meeting, Achilles accuses Agamemnon of being "greediest for gain of all men." To that, Agamemnon replies:

After that, only Athena stays Achilles's wrath. He vows to never again obey orders from Agamemnon. Furious, Achilles cries to his mother, Thetis, who persuades Zeus's divine intervention—favouring the Trojans—until Achilles's rights are restored. Meanwhile, Hector leads the Trojans to almost pushing the Achaeans back to the sea (Book XII). Later, Agamemnon contemplates defeat and retreat to Greece (Book XIV). Again, the Wrath of Achilles turns the war's tide in seeking vengeance when Hector kills Patroclus. Aggrieved, Achilles tears his hair and dirties his face. Thetis comforts her mourning son, who tells her:

Accepting the prospect of death as fair price for avenging Patroclus, he returns to battle, dooming Hector and Troy, thrice chasing him around the Trojan walls, before slaying him, then dragging the corpse behind his chariot, back to camp.

Date and textual history

The poem dates to the archaic period of Classical Antiquity. Scholarly consensus mostly places it in the late 8th century BC, although some favour a 7th-century date.

The historical backdrop of the poem is the time of the Late Bronze Age collapse, in the early 12th century BC. Homer is thus separated from his subject matter by about 400 years, the period known as the Greek Dark Ages. Intense scholarly debate has surrounded the question of which portions of the poem preserve genuine traditions from the Mycenaean period. The Catalogue of Ships in particular has the striking feature that its geography does not portray Greece in the Iron Age, the time of Homer, but as it was before the Dorian invasion.

It is used by Herodotus.

Venetus A, copied in the 10th century AD, is the oldest fully extant manuscript of the Iliad.

The first edition of the "Iliad", was edited by Demetrius Chalcondyles and published by Bernardus Nerlius and Demetrius Damilas in Florence in 1489.

As oral tradition
In antiquity, the Greeks applied the Iliad and the Odyssey as the bases of pedagogy. Literature was central to the educational-cultural function of the itinerant rhapsode, who composed consistent epic poems from memory and improvisation, and disseminated them, via song and chant, in his travels and at the Panathenaic Festival of athletics, music, poetics, and sacrifice, celebrating Athena's birthday.

Originally, Classical scholars treated the Iliad and the Odyssey as written poetry, and Homer as a writer. Yet, by the 1920s, Milman Parry (1902–1935) had launched a movement claiming otherwise. His investigation of the oral Homeric style—"stock epithets" and "reiteration" (words, phrases, stanzas)—established that these formulae were artifacts of oral tradition easily applied to a hexametric line. A two-word stock epithet (e.g. "resourceful Odysseus") reiteration may complement a character name by filling a half-line, thus, freeing the poet to compose a half-line of "original" formulaic text to complete his meaning. In Yugoslavia, Parry and his assistant, Albert Lord (1912–1991), studied the oral-formulaic composition of Serbian oral poetry, yielding the Parry/Lord thesis that established oral tradition studies, later developed by Eric Havelock, Marshall McLuhan, Walter Ong, and Gregory Nagy.

In The Singer of Tales (1960), Lord presents likenesses between the tragedies of the Achaean Patroclus, in the Iliad, and of the Sumerian Enkidu, in the Epic of Gilgamesh, and claims to refute, with "careful analysis of the repetition of thematic patterns", that the Patroclus storyline upsets Homer's established compositional formulae of "wrath, bride-stealing, and rescue"; thus, stock-phrase reiteration does not restrict his originality in fitting story to rhyme. Likewise, James Armstrong (1958) reports that the poem's formulae yield richer meaning because the "arming motif" diction—describing Achilles, Agamemnon, Paris, and Patroclus—serves to "heighten the importance of…an impressive moment," thus, "[reiteration] creates an atmosphere of smoothness," wherein, Homer distinguishes Patroclus from Achilles, and foreshadows the former's death with positive and negative turns of phrase.

In the Iliad, occasional syntactic inconsistency may be an oral tradition effect—for example, Aphrodite is "laughter-loving", despite being painfully wounded by Diomedes (Book V, 375); and the divine representations may mix Mycenaean and Greek Dark Age mythologies, parallelling the hereditary  nobles (lower social rank rulers) with minor deities, such as Scamander, et al.

Depiction of warfare

Depiction of infantry combat
Despite Mycenae and Troy being maritime powers, the Iliad features no sea battles. The Trojan shipwright (of the ship that transported Helen to Troy), Phereclus, instead fights afoot, as an infantryman. The battle dress and armour of hero and soldier are well-described. They enter battle in chariots, launching javelins into the enemy formations, then dismount—for hand-to-hand combat with yet more javelin throwing, rock throwing, and if necessary hand to hand sword and shoulder-borne  (shield) fighting. Ajax the Greater, son of Telamon, sports a large, rectangular shield with which he protects himself and Teucer, his brother:

Ajax's cumbersome shield is more suitable for defence than for offence, while his cousin Achilles sports a large, rounded, octagonal shield that he successfully deploys along with his spear against the Trojans:

In describing infantry combat, Homer names the phalanx formation, but most scholars do not believe the historical Trojan War was so fought. In the Bronze Age, the chariot was the main battle transport-weapon (e.g. the Battle of Kadesh). The available evidence, from the Dendra armour and the Pylos Palace paintings, indicate the Mycenaeans used two-man chariots, with a long-spear-armed principal rider, unlike the three-man Hittite chariots with short-spear-armed riders, and unlike the arrow-armed Egyptian and Assyrian two-man chariots. Nestor spearheads his troops with chariots; he advises them:

Although Homer's depictions are graphic, it can be seen in the very end that victory in war is a far more somber occasion, where all that is lost becomes apparent. On the other hand, the funeral games are lively, for the dead man's life is celebrated. This overall depiction of war runs contrary to many other ancient Greek depictions, where war is an aspiration for greater glory.

Modern reconstructions of armor, weapons and styles
Few modern (archeologically, historically and Homerically accurate) reconstructions of arms, armor and motifs as described by Homer exist. Some historical reconstructions have been done by Salimbeti et al.

Influence on classical Greek warfare
While the Homeric poems (particularly, the Iliad) were not necessarily revered scripture of the ancient Greeks, they were most certainly seen as guides that were important to the intellectual understanding of any educated Greek citizen. This is evidenced by the fact that in the late 5th century BC, "it was the sign of a man of standing to be able to recite the Iliad and Odyssey by heart." Moreover, it can be argued that the warfare shown in the Iliad, and the way in which it was depicted, had a profound and very traceable effect on Greek warfare in general. In particular, the effect of epic literature can be broken down into three categories: tactics, ideology, and the mindset of commanders.  In order to discern these effects, it is necessary to take a look at a few examples from each of these categories.

Much of the detailed fighting in the Iliad is done by the heroes in an orderly, one-on-one fashion. Much like the Odyssey, there is even a set ritual which must be observed in each of these conflicts. For example, a major hero may encounter a lesser hero from the opposing side, in which case the minor hero is introduced, threats may be exchanged, and then the minor hero is slain. The victor often strips the body of its armor and military accoutrements. Here is an example of this ritual and this type of one-on-one combat in the Iliad:

The biggest issue in reconciling the connection between the epic fighting of the Iliad and later Greek warfare is the phalanx, or hoplite, warfare seen in Greek history well after Homer's Iliad. While there are discussions of soldiers arrayed in semblances of the phalanx throughout the Iliad, the focus of the poem on the heroic fighting, as mentioned above, would seem to contradict the tactics of the phalanx. However, the phalanx did have its heroic aspects. The masculine one-on-one fighting of epic is manifested in phalanx fighting on the emphasis of holding one's position in formation. This replaces the singular heroic competition found in the Iliad.

One example of this is the Spartan tale of 300 picked men fighting against 300 picked Argives. In this battle of champions, only two men are left standing for the Argives and one for the Spartans. Othryades, the remaining Spartan, goes back to stand in his formation with mortal wounds while the remaining two Argives go back to Argos to report their victory. Thus, the Spartans claimed this as a victory, as their last man displayed the ultimate feat of bravery by maintaining his position in the phalanx.

In terms of the ideology of commanders in later Greek history, the Iliad has an interesting effect. The Iliad expresses a definite disdain for tactical trickery, when Hector says, before he challenges the great Ajax:

However, despite examples of disdain for this tactical trickery, there is reason to believe that the Iliad, as well as later Greek warfare, endorsed tactical genius on the part of their commanders. For example, there are multiple passages in the Iliad with commanders such as Agamemnon or Nestor discussing the arraying of troops so as to gain an advantage.  Indeed, the Trojan War is won by a notorious example of Achaean guile in the Trojan Horse. This is even later referred to by Homer in the Odyssey. The connection, in this case, between guileful tactics of the Achaeans and the Trojans in the Iliad and those of the later Greeks is not a difficult one to find. Spartan commanders, often seen as the pinnacle of Greek military prowess, were known for their tactical trickery, and, for them, this was a feat to be desired in a commander. Indeed, this type of leadership was the standard advice of Greek tactical writers.

Ultimately, while Homeric (or epic) fighting is certainly not completely replicated in later Greek warfare, many of its ideals, tactics, and instruction are.

Hans van Wees argues that the period that the descriptions of warfare relate can be pinned down fairly specifically—to the first half of the 7th century BC.

Influence on arts and culture

The Iliad was a standard work of great importance already in Classical Greece and remained so throughout the Hellenistic and Byzantine periods. Subjects from the Trojan War were a favourite among ancient Greek dramatists. Aeschylus' trilogy, the Oresteia, comprising Agamemnon, The Libation Bearers, and The Eumenides, follows the story of Agamemnon after his return from the war. Homer also came to be of great influence in European culture with the resurgence of interest in Greek antiquity during the Renaissance, and it remains the first and most influential work of the Western canon. In its full form the text made its return to Italy and Western Europe beginning in the 15th century, primarily through translations into Latin and the vernacular languages.

The West tended to view Homer as unreliable as they believed they possessed much more down to earth and realistic eyewitness accounts of the Trojan War written by Dares and Dictys Cretensis, who were supposedly present at the events. These late antique forged accounts formed the basis of several eminently popular medieval chivalric romances, most notably those of Benoît de Sainte-Maure and Guido delle Colonne.

These in turn spawned many others in various European languages, such as the first printed English book, the 1473 Recuyell of the Historyes of Troye. Even without Homer, the Trojan War story had remained central to Western European medieval literary culture and its sense of identity. Most nations and several royal houses traced their origins to heroes at the Trojan War; Britain was supposedly settled by the Trojan Brutus, for instance.

William Shakespeare used the plot of the Iliad as source material for his play Troilus and Cressida, but focused on a medieval legend, the love story of Troilus, son of King Priam of Troy, and Cressida, daughter of the Trojan soothsayer Calchas. The play, often considered to be a comedy, reverses traditional views on events of the Trojan War and depicts Achilles as a coward, Ajax as a dull, unthinking mercenary, etc.

William Theed the elder made an impressive bronze statue of Thetis as she brought Achilles his new armor forged by Hephaesthus. It has been on display in the Metropolitan Museum of Art in New York City since 2013.

Robert Browning's poem Development discusses his childhood introduction to the matter of the Iliad and his delight in the epic, as well as contemporary debates about its authorship.

According to Suleyman al-Boustani, a 19th-century poet who made the first Arabic translation of the Iliad to Arabic, the epic may have been widely circulated in Syriac and Pahlavi translations during the early Middle Ages. Al-Boustani credits Theophilus of Edessa with the Syriac translation, which was supposedly (along with the Greek original) widely read or heard by the scholars of Baghdad in the prime of the Abbasid Caliphate, although those scholars never took the effort to translate it to the official language of the empire; Arabic. The Iliad was also the first full epic poem to be translated to Arabic from a foreign language, upon the publication of Al-Boustani's complete work in 1904.

20th-century arts
 "The fall of Troy" (1911), an italian silent film by Giovanni Pastrone, the first known movie adaptation of Homer's epic poem.
 "Achilles in the Trench" is one of the best-known of the war poems of the First World War and was written by Patrick Shaw-Stewart while waiting to be sent to fight at Gallipoli.
 Simone Weil wrote the essay "The Iliad or the Poem of Force" in 1939, shortly after the commencement of World War II. The essay describes how the Iliad demonstrates the way force, exercised to the extreme in war, reduces both victim and aggressor to the level of the slave and the unthinking automaton.
 Lesya Ukrainka wrote a dramatic poem "Cassandra" in 1901-1907 based on the Iliad. It describes the story of Kassandra, a prophetess.
 The 1954 Broadway musical The Golden Apple, by librettist John Treville Latouche and composer Jerome Moross, was freely adapted from the Iliad and the Odyssey, re-setting the action to America's Washington state in the years after the Spanish–American War, with events inspired by the Iliad in Act One and events inspired by the Odyssey in Act Two.
 The opera King Priam by Sir Michael Tippett (which received its premiere in 1962) is based loosely on the Iliad.
 Christopher Logue's poem War Music, an "account", not a translation, of the Iliad, was begun in 1959 as a commission for radio. He continued working on it until his death in 2011. Described by Tom Holland as "one of the most remarkable works of post-war literature", it has been an influence on Kae Tempest and Alice Oswald, who says that it "unleashes a forgotten kind of theatrical energy into the world."
 Christa Wolf's novel Cassandra (1983) is a critical engagement with the Iliad. Wolf's narrator is Cassandra, whose thoughts are heard at the moment just before her murder by Clytemnestra in Sparta. Wolf's narrator presents a feminist's view of the war, and of war in general. Cassandra's story is accompanied by four essays which Wolf delivered as the Frankfurter Poetik-Vorlesungen. The essays present Wolf's concerns as a writer and rewriter of this canonical story and show the genesis of the novel through Wolf's own readings and in a trip she took to Greece.
 David Melnick's Men in Aida (1983) is a postmodern homophonic translation of Book One into a farcical bathhouse scenario, preserving the sounds but not the meaning of the original.
 Marion Zimmer Bradley's 1987 novel The Firebrand retells the story from the point of view of Kassandra, a princess of Troy and a prophetess who is cursed by Apollo.

Contemporary popular culture
 Eric Shanower's Image Comics series Age of Bronze, which began in 1998, retells the legend of the Trojan War.
 Dan Simmons' epic science fiction adaptation/tribute Ilium was released in 2003, receiving a Locus Award for best science fiction novel of 2003.
 Troy (2004), a loose film adaptation of the Iliad, received mixed reviews but was a commercial success, particularly in international sales. It grossed $133 million in the United States and $497 million worldwide, making it the 188th top-grossing movie of all time.
 Madeline Miller's 2011 debut novel The Song of Achilles tells the story of Achilles' and Patroclus' life together as children, lovers, and soldiers. The novel, which won the 2012 Women's Prize for Fiction, draws on the Iliad as well as the works of other classical authors such as Statius, Ovid, and Virgil.
 Alice Oswald's sixth collection, Memorial (2011), is based on but departs from the narrative form of the Iliad to focus on, and so commemorate, the individually-named characters whose deaths are mentioned in that poem. Later in October 2011, Memorial was shortlisted for the T. S. Eliot Prize, but in December 2011, Oswald withdrew the book from the shortlist, citing concerns about the ethics of the prize's sponsors.
 The Rage of Achilles, by American author and Yale Writers' Conference founder Terence Hawkins, recounts the Iliad as a novel in modern, sometimes graphic language. Informed by Julian Jaynes' theory of the bicameral mind and the historicity of the Trojan War, it depicts its characters as real men to whom the gods appear only as hallucinations or command voices during the sudden and painful transition to truly modern consciousness.

English translations

George Chapman published his translation of the Iliad, in installments, beginning in 1598, published in "fourteeners", a long-line ballad metre that "has room for all of Homer's figures of speech and plenty of new ones, as well as explanations in parentheses. At its best, as in Achilles' rejection of the embassy in Iliad Nine; it has great rhetorical power." It quickly established itself as a classic in English poetry. In the preface to his own translation, Pope praises "the daring fiery spirit" of Chapman's rendering, which is "something like what one might imagine Homer, himself, would have writ before he arrived at years of discretion."

John Keats praised Chapman in the sonnet On First Looking into Chapman's Homer (1816). John Ogilby's mid-17th-century translation is among the early annotated editions; Alexander Pope's 1715 translation, in heroic couplet, is "The classic translation that was built on all the preceding versions," and, like Chapman's, it is a major poetic work in its own right. William Cowper's Miltonic, blank verse 1791 edition is highly regarded for its greater fidelity to the Greek than either the Chapman or the Pope versions: "I have omitted nothing; I have invented nothing," Cowper says in prefacing his translation.

In the lectures On Translating Homer (1861), Matthew Arnold addresses the matters of translation and interpretation in rendering the Iliad to English; commenting upon the versions contemporarily available in 1861, he identifies the four essential poetic qualities of Homer to which the translator must do justice:

[i] that he is eminently rapid; [ii] that he is eminently plain and direct, both in the evolution of his thought and in the expression of it, that is, both in his syntax and in his words; [iii] that he is eminently plain and direct in the substance of his thought, that is, in his matter and ideas; and, finally, [iv] that he is eminently noble.

After a discussion of the metres employed by previous translators, Arnold argues for a poetical dialect hexameter translation of the Iliad, like the original. "Laborious as this meter was, there were at least half a dozen attempts to translate the entire Iliad or Odyssey in hexameters; the last in 1945. Perhaps the most fluent of them was by J. Henry Dart [1862] in response to Arnold." In 1870, the American poet William Cullen Bryant published a blank verse version, that Van Wyck Brooks describes as "simple, faithful."

An 1898 translation by Samuel Butler was published by Longmans. Butler had read Classics at Cambridge University, graduating in 1859.

Since 1950, there have been several English translations. Richmond Lattimore's version (1951) is "a free six-beat" line-for-line rendering that explicitly eschews "poetical dialect" for "the plain English of today." It is literal, unlike older verse renderings. Robert Fitzgerald's version (Oxford World's Classics, 1974) strives to situate the Iliad in the musical forms of English poetry. His forceful version is freer, with shorter lines that increase the sense of swiftness and energy.

Robert Fagles (Penguin Classics, 1990) and Stanley Lombardo (1997) are bolder than Lattimore in adding dramatic significance to Homer's conventional and formulaic language. Rodney Merrill's translation (University of Michigan Press, 2007) not only renders the work in English verse like the dactylic hexameter of the original, but also conveys the oral-formulaic nature of the epic song, to which that musical meter gives full value. Barry B. Powell's translation (Oxford University Press, 2014) renders the Homeric Greek with a simplicity and dignity reminiscent of the original.

Peter Green translated the Iliad in 2015, a version published by the University of California Press.

Caroline Alexander published the first full-length English translation by a woman in 2015.

Manuscripts
There are more than 2000 manuscripts of Homer. Some of the most notable manuscripts include:
 Rom. Bibl. Nat. gr. 6 + Matriti. Bibl. Nat. 4626 from 870–890 AD
 Venetus A = Venetus Marc. 822 from the 10th century
 Venetus B = Venetus Marc. 821 from the 11th century
 Ambrosian Iliad
 Papyrus Oxyrhynchus 20
 Papyrus Oxyrhynchus 21
 Codex Nitriensis (palimpsest)

See also

 Mask of Agamemnon
 Parallels between Virgil's Aeneid and Homer's Iliad and Odyssey
 Heinrich Schliemann

References

Notes

Citations

Bibliography

Further reading
 De Jong, Irene (2012). Iliad. Book XXII, Cambridge University Press. 
 Edwards, Mark W.; Janko, Richard; Kirk, G.S., The Iliad: A Commentary: Volume IV, Books 13–16, Cambridge University Press, 1992. 
 Edwards, Mark W.; Kirk, G.S., The Iliad: A Commentary: Volume V, Books 17–20, Cambridge University Press, 1991. 
 Graziosi, Barbara; Haubold, Johannes, Iliad: Book VI, Cambridge University Press, 2010. 
 Hainsworth, Bryan; Kirk, G.S., The Iliad: A Commentary: Volume III, Books 9–12, Cambridge University Press, 1993. ]
 Kirk, G.S., The Iliad: A Commentary: Volume I, Books 1–4, Cambridge University Press, 1985. 
 Kirk, G.S., The Iliad: A Commentary: Volume II, Books 5–8, Cambridge University Press, 1990. 
 Murray, A.T.; Wyatt, William F., Homer: The Iliad, Books I–XII, Loeb Classical Library, Harvard University Press, 1999, 
 Richardson, Nicholas; Kirk, G.S., The Iliad: A Commentary: Volume VI, Books 21–24, Cambridge University Press, 1993. 
 West, Martin L., Studies in the text and transmission of the Iliad, München : K.G. Saur, 2001.

External links

 
 
 Multiple translations of the Iliad at Project Gutenberg:
 The Iliad of Homer, by George Chapman, at Project Gutenberg
 The Iliad of Homer, by Alexander Pope, at Project Gutenberg
 The Iliad of Homer, by William Cowper, at Project Gutenberg
 The Iliad of Homer, by Theodore Alois Buckley, at Project Gutenberg
 The Iliad of Homer, by Edward, Earl of Derby, at Project Gutenberg
 The Iliad of Homer, by Andrew Lang, Walter Leaf and Ernest Meyers, at Project Gutenberg
 The Iliad of Homer, by Samuel Butler, at Project Gutenberg
 Iliad : from the Perseus Project (PP), with the Murray and Butler translations and hyperlinks to mythological and grammatical commentary
 Gods, Achaeans and Troyans. An interactive visualization of The Iliads characters flow and relations.
 The Iliad: A Study Guide
 Comments on background, plot, themes, authorship, and translation issues by 2008 translator Herbert Jordan.
 Flaxman illustrations of the Iliad
 The Iliad study guide, themes, quotes, teacher resources
  Digital facsimile  of the first printed publication (editio princeps) of the Iliad in Homeric Greek  by Demetrios Chalkokondyles,  Bayerische Staatsbibliothek

 
8th-century BC books
8th-century BC poems
Ancient Greek epic poems
Ancient Greek religion
Epic Cycle
Poems adapted into films
Public domain books
Trojan War literature